Brynhildur Þórarinsdóttir (born 1970) is an Icelandic children's writer. She was born in Reykjavík. Among her children's books are Njala from 2002, Egla from 2004, and Laxdæla from 2006. She was awarded the Icelandic Children's Book Prize in 2004 for her Leyndardómur ljónsins and the Nordic Children's Book Prize in 2007. She lectures at the University of Akureyri.

Awards 
2004: Icelandic Children's Book Prize 
2007: Nordic Children's Book Prize, for renarration of three Sagas of Icelanders, the Njáls saga, Egil's Saga and Laxdæla saga.

See also 

 List of Icelandic writers
 Icelandic literature

References 

1970 births
Brynhildur Thorarinsdottir
Living people
Brynhildur Thorarinsdottir
Icelandic women children's writers